Veobreen is a glacier in the municipalities of Lom and Vågå in Innlandet county, Norway. The  glacier is located within the Jotunheimen National Park. The glacier is located on the west side of the mountain Veotinden, north of the mountain Store Memurutinden, east of Veobreahesten, Veobretinden, and Leirhøi, and south of Veopallan.

See also
List of glaciers in Norway

References

Glaciers of Innlandet
Vågå
Lom, Norway
Jotunheimen